Ching Siu-tung (Chinese: 程小東, born October 31, 1953), also known as Tony Ching, is a Hong Kong action choreographer, actor, film director and producer, who has directed over 20 films, including the critically acclaimed supernatural fantasy A Chinese Ghost Story (1987). He produced the expensive music video for "L'Âme-Stram-Gram" by the French singer Mylène Farmer in the style of A Chinese Ghost Story at a cost of €1 million. He studied in the Eastern Drama Academy and trained in Northern Style Kung Fu for 7 years.

Career
Ching began as an actor and martial arts instructor working in Hong Kong action cinema in the 1960s and 1970s (his father, Ching Gong, was a Shaw Brothers Studio director, and Ching Siu-tung had been trained in Peking opera as a child), but he made his directorial debut in 1982 with the ground-breaking wuxia classic Duel to the Death.

Ching worked with producer Tsui Hark on 1987's A Chinese Ghost Story, which became an international sensation, although it was usually Tsui Hark who took most of the plaudits. He continued to work with Tsui Hark, directing sequels to that film in 1990 and 1991, and co-directing all three parts of the Swordsman series, starting in 1990. Other directorial highlights included the highly successful Royal Tramp films (both 1992) which starred Stephen Chow and Brigitte Lin.

Ching continued his role as action director / choreographer throughout this period, and has continued to work in that role on high-profile international successes like Shaolin Soccer (2001), Hero (2002), and House of Flying Daggers (2004).

In 2002, Ching was nominated twice for Best Action Choreography at the Hong Kong Film Awards, and won in 2003 for his efforts on Hero. That same year, he made his American film debut, directing Steven Seagal in the direct-to-video feature Belly of the Beast. In 2006, he choreographed the action scenes in the Indian superhero film Krrish, for which he won a Filmfare Best Action Award and Zee Cine Award.

In 2008, Ching directed An Empress and the Warriors, in which he also served as action choreographer. The film stars Kelly Chen, Donnie Yen and Leon Lai.

Filmography

Director

Action choreographer

References

External links
Kung Fu Cinema interview

 HK cinemagic entry

Hong Kong film directors
1953 births
Living people
Hong Kong film producers
Action choreographers
Horror film directors
People from Anhui